Ophiothrix is a large genus of brittle stars (Ophiuroidea) found in oceans worldwide from tropics to Arctic and Antarctic regions. At present a total of 93 Ophiothrix species have been recognized. It is considered as one of the most interesting genera because of the presence of its brilliant colors and associations with coral and sponges as well. This genus has been labelled particularly difficult with respect to taxonomy, due to a high degree of variability in characters that are described is a morphological aspect.

Evolution 
The fossil record of brittle stars can be traced back around 500 million years to Early Ordovician period. Despite the fact there have been a considerable number of fossils reported from Paleozoic, Mesozoic and Cenozoic periods, a startlingly little amount is known about the evolutionary history of the group. Paleozoic ophiuroids bear an uncanny resemblance to the modern relatives with respect to ambulacral plate pairs which have been fused firmly into their vertebrae and ambulacral groove which their ventral arm plates cover. They also have the presence of ventrally lateral arm plates.

Systematics and phylogeny
Ophiothrix is a large genus that is currently divided into the following three subgenera: Acanthophiothrix, Ophiothrix and Theophiothrix'. Extant species include:

References

Ophiotrichidae
Ophiuroidea genera